The men's skeet competition at the 2014 Asian Games in Incheon, South Korea was held on 29 and 30 September at the Gyeonggido Shooting Range.

Schedule
All times are Korea Standard Time (UTC+09:00)

Records

Results
Legend
DNS — Did not start

Qualification

Semifinal

Finals

Bronze medal match

Gold medal match

References

ISSF Results Overview

External links
Official website

Men Shotgun S